Hatred of a Minute is a 2002 thriller film directed by and starring Michael Kallio and produced by Bruce Campbell. Kallio co-wrote the script with Lisa Jesswein who also appears in the movie. Producer Campbell also makes a brief cameo in the film.

Plot
Eric Seaver is a young man that was abused as a child. He has since grown up to become a serial killer with a steady job as a medical transcriptionist, transcribing autopsy reports, and a fiancé. As Eric's killings become more frequent, his stable life is threatened and his rage begins to take over any sanity he had left.

Cast
 Gunnar Hansen as Barry, The Stepfather
 Michael Kallio as Eric Seaver
Matthew Fennelly as Young Eric Seaver
 Tracee Newberry as Jamie
 Tim Lovelace as Detective Glenn Usher
 Lisa Jesswein as Sarah Usher
 Michael Robert Brandon as Jack, The Demon
 Jeffrey Steiger as Michael, The Angel
 June Munger as Linda, The Mother
 Colleen Nash as Terry
 Michelle Kuhl as 'Cookie'
 Rebecka Read as Amy
 John F. Gray as Derek

Production
The film was budgeted at an estimated $300,000. The film's title comes from a line of an Edgar Allan Poe poem on which the film's story is based.

Reception 
DVD Talk reviewed the film, writing that "There's a lot of promise to be found in Hatred of a Minute, but despite the tears and years that went into bringing the project to fruition, the end result didn't completely gel for me." Ain't It Cool News was critical, as they felt that "the blood and gore in this film barely qualifies as graphic or shocking."

References

External links

2002 films
2002 thriller films